Pat Harte is an Irish Gaelic footballer who plays for Ballina and the Mayo county team.  He is a midfielder.  Harte's recent successes include reaching the All-Ireland Senior Football Championship 2006 final, although Kerry beat Mayo 4-15 to 3–5.

External links
https://web.archive.org/web/20081012082127/http://archives.tcm.ie/westernpeople/2006/06/28/story31703.asp
https://web.archive.org/web/20100812071203/http://www.rte.ie/sport/gaa/championship/2007/0510/kerryvmayogallery.html
http://www.rte.ie/sport/2006/0917/matchtracker.html
http://www.independent.ie/sport/gaelic-football/mayos-dream-day-wont-be-repeated-this-year-41058.html

1983 births
Living people
Ballina Stephenites Gaelic footballers
Mayo inter-county Gaelic footballers
People from Castlebar